HPK Kiekkonaiset or HPK Naiset are an ice hockey team in the Naisten Liiga (NSML), the premier women's ice hockey league in Finland. HPK were the first team to be awarded the Aurora Borealis Cup as the winners of the Finnish Championship in 2011 and also won bronze in the 2011–12 IIHF European Women's Champions Cup.

They are the representative women's ice hockey team of the multi-sport club Hämeenlinnan Pallokerho (HPK), however, the team is directly owned by HPK Liiga Oy, the ownership organization of the Liiga team HPK. HPK Kiekkonaiset are one of two Naisten Liiga teams owned directly by a men's league team.

History 
A women's ice hockey team has competed under the parent club HPK since at least 1999. From 1999 to 2008, HPK Kiekkonaiset competed in the Naisten I-divisioona (renamed Naisten Mestis in 2013). In 2001, the team qualified to contend for promotion to the Naisten SM-sarja (renamed Naisten Liiga in 2017) in the league's  (qualification series) but they lost eleven of fourteen qualification games and remained in the I-divisoona. The opportunity for promotion through the  returned in the 2007–08 season and, this time, with a roster that included Meeri Räisänen, Essi Salminen, Hanne Sikiö, and Eveliina Similä, HPK achieved promotion to the Naisten SM-sarja.

HPK debuted in the Naisten SM-sarja at the opening of the 2008–09 season, strengthened by the addition of a number of experienced players, notably Petra Herzigová, Katja Riipi, Nora Tallus, and Vilma Vaattovaara. The team won the bronze medal match against Oulun Kärpät with a game winning goal from Riipi.

HPK was the first team to be awarded the Aurora Borealis Cup the Naisten SM-sarja Champions in 2011. 

As the 2011 Finnish Champions, the team was automatically granted placement in the second round, Group E of the following season's IIHF European Women's Champions Cup (EWCC). The Group E round-robin was contested in Hämeenlinna during 2 to 4 December 2011 and HPK bested ESC Planegg, Aisulu Almaty, and the EHV Sabres to sweep the series and earn a berth in the tournament finals. Venla Hovi and Riikka Noronen led all Group E skaters in scoring, with 9 points and 7 points in four games, respectively. The EWCC Finals were also hosted in Hämeenlinna and were played during 24 to 26 February 2012 at Metritiski Areena. HPK won their first match, beating ESC Planegg with a score of 3–2, but they were unable to overcome the scoring power and excellent goaltending of their final two opponents, losing 2–6 to Tornado Moscow Region and 1–5 to the ZSC Lions Frauen. They were awarded European Women's Champions Cup bronze medals, becoming the third Finnish team to medal in the EWCC.

In June 2021, it was announced that the team would be transferred to HPK Liiga Oy, owner of the HPK Liiga team and the U20 SM-sarja team HPK U20. HPK Kiekkonaiset had previously been a part of the HPK-affiliated junior ice hockey club HPK Edustusjääkiekko Ry, a non-profit registered association. At the time of the transfer, Antti Toivanen, CEO of HPK Liiga Oy and general manager of the HPK men's team, explained that the move was motivated by an interest in capitalizing on the growing women's ice hockey market, which had been highlighted by the record crowds that attended the 2019 IIHF Women's World Championship in Espoo. Jorma Hassinen, general manager of HPK Kiekkonaiset, expressed hope that the transfer would allow female players to develop with the same opportunities as their male counterparts.

Season-by-season results 
This is a partial list of the most recent seasons completed by HPK Naiset. 
Note: Finish = Rank at end of regular season; GP = Games played, W = Wins (3 points), OTW = Overtime wins (2 points), OTL = Overtime losses (1 point), L = Losses, GF = Goals for, GA = Goals against, Pts = Points, Top scorer: Points (Goals+Assists)

Players and personnel

2022–23 roster 

Coaching staff and team personnel
 Head coach: Jari Risku
 Assistant coach: Emmi Leinonen
 Goaltending coach: Maija Hassinen-Sullanmaa
 Team manager: Maija Hassinen-Sullanmaa
 Equipment managers: Hanna Haakana & Kari Järvinen
 Functionaries: Inka Kuusinen & Riikka Noronen

Team captaincy history 
 Nora Tallus, 2008–2010
 Mira Huhta, 2010–2013
 Riikka Noronen, 2013–2017
 Jutta Stoltenberg, 2017–2019
 Riikka Noronen, 2019–2021
 Heta Seikkula, 2021–

Head coaches 
 Tuomo Nukari, 2011–January 2013
 Jarkko Julkunen, January 2013–2013
 Vesa Mäkinen, 2014–2016
 Marko Rahikainen, 2016–2018
 Markku Pirttiniemi, 2018–19
 Katja Pasanen, 2019–20
 Mari Saarinen, 2020–21
 Harri Nummela, 2021–22
 Jari Risku, 2022–

Team honours

Finnish Championship 

  Aurora Borealis Cup (1): 2011
  Runners-up (1): 2016
  Third Place (4): 2009, 2010, 2012, 2014
Source:

IIHF European Women's Champions Cup

  Bronze (1): 2012

Notable alumnae 
Years active with HPK listed alongside player names.
 Maija Hassinen-Sullanmaa, 2008–2015 & 2017–18
 Venla Hovi, 2010–2012
 Kati Kovalainen, 2009–10
 Sanna Lankosaari, 2009–2012
 Riikka Noronen, 2009–2017 & 2018–2022
 Annina Rajahuhta, 2010–2012
 Meeri Räisänen, 2017–18
 Eveliina Similä, 2008–2012
 Susanna Tapani, 2014–2016
 Vilma Vaattovaara, 2008–2011
 Tea Villilä, 2010–11 & 2015–16

International players 
  Nicole Andenmatten, 2021–22
  Samantha Benoit, 2021–22
  Kristina Brown, 2014–15
  Lenka Čurmová, 2020–21
  Megan Delay, 2021–22
  Pia Dukarič, 2019–20
  Petra Herzigová, 2008–09 & 2013–2015
  Lucia Ištocyová, 2021–22
  Adéla Jůzková, 2020–21
  Lívia Kúbeková, 2021–22
  Natsumi Kurokawa, 2019–20
  Margaux Mameri, September–November 2022
  Alena Mills, September–November 2021
  Kassidy Sauvé, 2021–22
  Miho Shishiuchi, 2014–2016
  Sofia Vysokajová, 2021–22
  Hannah Westbrook, 2012–13

See also 
 Women's ice hockey in Finland
 Finland women's national ice hockey team
 Finland women's national under-18 ice hockey team

References

External links 
  
 Team information and statistics from Eliteprospects.com and Eurohockey.com and Hockeyarchives.info

1999 establishments in Finland
Ice hockey teams in Finland
Naisten Liiga (ice hockey) teams
Sport in Hämeenlinna
Women's ice hockey in Finland